Crusade:Zero is the ninth studio album by the Polish death metal band Hate. It was released on January 25, 2015 in Europe and February 10 in the United States and Canada. It was produced by the  Wieslawski Brothers and was recorded and mixed at Hertz Studio, Poland. It is the first album to feature drummer Paweł "Pavulon" Jaroszewicz.

A music video for the song "Valley of Darkness" was released on January 8, 2015.

Track list

Personnel
 Hate
 Adam "ATF Sinner" Buszko – vocals, guitars, bass
 Konrad "Destroyer" Ramotowski – guitars
 Paweł "Pavulon" Jaroszewicz – drums

 Production
 Daniel Rusiłowicz – cover art
 Sławek & Wojtek Wiesławscy – production, mixing, mastering, engineering  
 Michał Staczkun – engineering, soundscapes, samples

References 

2015 albums
Napalm Records albums